Moncure, North Carolina is a small rural unincorporated community in southeastern Chatham County, North Carolina, United States.

Moncure may also refer to:

Surname
Frank P. Moncure (1889–1969), Virginia lawyer and politician
Jane Belk Moncure (1926–2013), American author of early childhood non-fiction, fiction and poetry
Richard C. L. Moncure (1805–1882), Virginia politician and jurist
Richard C. L. Moncure (politician) (1872–1937), American Democratic politician, member of the Virginia Senate

Given name
Moncure D. Conway (1832–1907), American abolitionist and minister
Anne Moncure Crane (1838–1872), American writer and novelist
John Moncure Daniel (1825–1865), United States minister to the Kingdom of Sardinia in 1854–1861
Joseph Moncure March (1899–1977), American poet and essayist
Moncure Robinson (1802–1891), American civil engineer, railroad planner and builder and a railroad and steamboat owner

See also
Moncur